Wylye railway station is a former railway station in Wylye, Wiltshire, UK, in the Wylye Valley. The station name was spelled "Wiley" by the GWR until 1874.  The main building was on the left side of the line when travelling east towards Salisbury with a goods shed east of the platform and a level crossing beyond.  Originally single track, the line from the west was doubled in 1900 and onwards towards Salisbury in 1901.

Passenger services were withdrawn on 19 September 1955 but goods traffic continued to be handled until 2 October 1961.  The signal box was closed in 1973 when the level crossing was given automatic barriers.

References

 

Disused railway stations in Wiltshire
Former Great Western Railway stations
Railway stations in Great Britain opened in 1856
Railway stations in Great Britain closed in 1955